Jaideep or Jaidip is an Indian name that may refer to:
Jaideep Ahlawat (born 1980), Indian film actor
Jaideep Chopra (born 1971), Indian film director, producer and writer
Jaideep Deswal (born 1989), Indian Paralympic athlete
Jaideep Mehrotra (born 1954), Indian artist
Jaidip Mukerjea (born 1942), Indian tennis player
Jaideep Patel, Indian medical doctor
Jaideep Prabhu (born 1967), Professor of Business and Enterprise at the University of Cambridge, England
Jaideep Sahni (born 1968), Indian screenwriter
Jaideep Saikia, Indian security and terrorism expert
Jaideep Singh (born 1987), Indian-Japanese heavyweight kickboxer and mixed martial artist
Jaideep Srivastava (born 1959) Indian-American computer scientist, professor of Computer Science at the University of Minnesota
Jaideep Varma, Indian writer, screenwriter and filmmaker